Gustavo Méndez (born November 24, 1967) is a football (soccer) referee from Uruguay, best known for supervising two matches at the Copa América 2004 in Peru. He also led four games during the 2006 FIFA World Cup qualification in South America.

References
 Profile

1967 births
Living people
Uruguayan football referees
Copa América referees
Place of birth missing (living people)
CONCACAF Gold Cup referees